Stanyan Street is a north–south street in San Francisco, California marking the eastern side of the Golden Gate Park and the western side of the Panhandle. It is named after Charles H. Stanyan, a city supervisor from 1866 to 1869 who was on the committee which sited the park.

The street is celebrated in one of Rod McKuen's poem collections Stanyan Street & Other Sorrows (1966), and in Nick Waterhouse's song 'Stanyan Street', from his 2016 release Never Twice.

References

Streets in San Francisco